Brian Kennedy may refer to:

Brian Kennedy (businessman), British businessman, majority owner of the Sale Sharks Rugby Union Club
Brian Kennedy (gallery director) (born 1961), art gallery director, director of the Peabody Essex Museum, Salem, Mass, USA
Brian Kennedy (journalist) (died 1991), journalist and activist who helped set up the London Lesbian and Gay Centre in 1985
Brian Kennedy (record producer) (born 1983), American songwriter, record producer, and musician
Brian Kennedy (singer) (born 1966), Irish singer-songwriter and author 
Brian K. Kennedy (born 1967), American biologist
Brian Patrick Kennedy (born 1961), American state legislator in Rhode Island
Brian Kennedy (hurler) (born 1992), Irish hurler
Brian Kennedy (basketball), American college basketball coach
Brian T. Kennedy (1934–2012), American politician in New Jersey
Brian Kennedy (table tennis), English table tennis player
Brian Kennedy (Gaelic footballer) (born 1998)

See also
Bryan Kennedy (disambiguation)